Posh Boy Records is a Hollywood, California-based record label owned by the American-born, British-educated Robbie "Posh Boy" Fields, a sometime high school substitute teacher and former copy boy at the Los Angeles Times who took an interest in the emerging punk rock scene in Orange County, California during the late 1970s.

The label's releases enjoyed substantial airplay on Rodney Bingenheimer's show on KROQ-FM, and some of them, notably the Fields-produced version of "Amoeba" by the Adolescents and the Stephen Hague-produced electronic rock track "Are You Ready for the Sex Girls" by the Sparks offshoot the Gleaming Spires, made it into regular programming on the station.

Social Distortion was one of many bands whose first recordings were issued by Posh Boy. One of the label's most successful releases was Agent Orange's debut, Living in Darkness, containing "Bloodstains", an extreme sports  anthem covered by many alternative rock groups (the most notable being the Offspring in 2000 on the Ready to Rumble film soundtrack).

Since 1999, expatriate and now known as Posh Boy Music, the label continued releasing music into the 2020s, the last vinyl release being a 7" by the Willowz of Anaheim, California in 2003. Subsequently, the label transitioned to being digital only with over 700 recordings released digitally, and to sublicense vinyl, compact disc and audio cassette rights to other labels, notably Radiation Records (Italy).

More recently, the label entered into a licensing agreement with Netflix for use of its extensive back catalog. Stranger Things 2 has used music by Posh Boy acts Channel 3 and Ill Repute. Channel 3 were also featured in the inaugural season of White Famous on Showtime.

During the COVID lockdown, post 2020, the label pivoted to concentrate on non punk music with an emphasis on chamber music working with such leading musicians as composer Gene Pritsker, Some Nicholson, the painter David Nicholson, classical guitarist Warren Nicholson, violist Paul Cortese, singer Chanda Rule amongst others.  Recent pop music signings include Scottish band The Moon Kids., Phil Proietti and Keysha Veen who scored a bona fide hit on SiriusXM's Velvet Channel with "You Saved My World".  Alternative releases include Channel 3, Professor and the Madman, Santa Barbara's The Tearaways and 1980's comedy icon Nigel Planer.

Early Releases 

The label released the following records:

References

External links
 

Defunct record labels of the United States
Punk record labels